Navigation: The OMD B-Sides is the fourth compilation album by English electronic band Orchestral Manoeuvres in the Dark. It was released in 2001 by Virgin Records and contains a variety of B-sides from their Dindisc and Virgin output.

Reception

Trouser Press wrote, "Navigation: The OMD B-Sides is an essential document for fans. [Andy] McCluskey and [Paul] Humphreys always took care to put worthwhile tracks on the backs of their singles, and nearly all of the songs here were worthy of inclusion on albums." Aaron Badgley in AllMusic noted that "A lot of the music is instrumental and not what casual fans are used to hearing from OMD", but opined that the album "is no less enjoyable than their biggest hits". He asserted that the record is "a must" for enthusiasts of the band.

Track listing

CD: Virgin / CDV 2938 (UK)

References

B-side compilation albums
Orchestral Manoeuvres in the Dark albums
2001 compilation albums
Virgin Records compilation albums